Bílá jachta ve Splitu is a 1939 Czechoslovak film directed and written by Ladislav Brom, based on a story by Milan Begović. The film starred Josef Kemr.

References

External links
 

1939 films
1930s Czech-language films
Czechoslovak romance films
1930s romance films
Czechoslovak black-and-white films
Czech romantic films
1930s Czech films